The Modern Hospital (published 1913 to 1974) was the American Hospital Association's trade journal in the fields of "nursing, hospital and allied magazines."

They published year books, and their Gold Medal was given as recognition of "a significant contribution to the literature of hospitals and hospital service."

Their publisher, McGraw Hill Publications, closed the magazine in 1974.

Reporting
The magazine wrote about new hospitals and conditions in existing ones. Smithsonian magazine wrote about Modern Hospital 1942 coverage of proposed windowless hospital rooms: "in the 1940s it was a shocking proposal" since it violated "a fundamental assumption: In order to remain disease-free and health-giving, hospital spaces required direct access to sunlight and fresh air."

One of their features was "hospital of the month".

Competition
Among competing periodicals of the magazine's era were:
 Hospital Management
 The Trained Nurse and Hospital Review, a nursing journal
 Modern Nursing Home
 Public Health Nursing

References

External links

Defunct magazines published in the United States
Magazines disestablished in 1974
Professional and trade magazines
Magazines established in 1913